Noh Hyeong-ouk (Korean: 노형욱, born 1962) is a South Korean activist and government official who has been the Minister of Land, Infrastructure and Transport since 14 May 2021. He previously served as the Minister for Government Policy Coordination from 2018 to 2020, and the 2nd Deputy Minister from 2016 to 2018.

Education and early career 
Born in Sunchang, North Jeolla, Noh attended Gwangju Jeil High School and studied political diplomacy at Yonsei University. He also obtained 2 master's degrees; one in public administration from Seoul National University while another one in international economics at Sciences Po.

He is a colleague to Kim Hyun-mee, the former and the first Minister of Land, Infrastructure and Transport under the President Moon Jae-in. Both used to be involved in student movements during the university life. He is also a junior to the former Prime Minister Lee Nak-yon.

Career 
After qualifying for the Public Administration Examination in 1986, Noh has been working at the Ministry of Economy and Finance (formerly the Ministry of Planning and Budget), where he served various positions, including the Head of the Welfare, Labour and Budget.

In 2009, he served as the Director General for Policy Planning of the Ministry of Health and Welfare. He strengthened the social safety net that was influenced by the global financial crisis.

In August 2016, Noh became the 2nd Deputy Minister for Government Policy Coordination under the then President Park Geun-hye. After Moon Jae-in was elected the new president in 2017, he remained the position until he was promoted as the Minister in 2018. He was replaced by Koo Yun-cheol in 2020.

On 16 April 2021, Noh was nominated the new Minister of Land, Infrastructure and Transport, replacing the controversial incumbent Byeon Chang-heum. He was officially appointed on 14 May.

References 

1962 births
Living people
South Korean politicians
South Korean activists